André van Schaik is a professor of electrical engineering at the Western Sydney University, and director of the International Centre for Neuromorphic Systems, in Penrith, New South Wales, Australia. He was named a Fellow of the Institute of Electrical and Electronics Engineers (IEEE) in 2014 "for contributions to neuromorphic circuits and systems".

Education

Van Schaik received the M.Sc. degree in electrical engineering from the University of Twente, Enschede, the Netherlands, in 1990, and his Ph.D. degree from the Swiss Federal Institute of Technology (EPFL), Lausanne, Switzerland, in 1998.

Career

As an undergraduate student, Van Schaik was an intern at the Institute for Microelectronics Stuttgart, where we researched limits to the fault tolerance of feedforward neural networks, which led to a widely cited scientific publication.

After completing his M.Sc degree, he worked as an engineer at the Swiss Center for Electronics and Microtechnology, where he designed a neuromorphic optical motion-tracking chip for the Logitech TrackMan Marble, which came on the market in 1994; as of 2023, that device is still sold, still with his original chip design, nearly 30 years old.

In 1994, he started his PhD research in the MANTRA Centre for Neuro-Mimetic Systems at the Swiss Federal Institute of Technology (EPFL), Lausanne, Switzerland under supervision of Eric Vittoz, a pioneer of low-power VLSI and co-developer of the EKV MOSFET model, and in close collaboration with Ray Meddis, who was an expert in computer simulation of the auditory pathway. His thesis is titled "Analogue VLSI building blocks for an electronic auditory pathway" led to a journal article with Meddis.

In 1998 he joined the laboratory of Simon Carlile in the Department of Physiology at the University of Sydney as a postdoctoral research fellow, where he collaborated on the development of spatial audio over headphones, termed virtual auditory space.

In 1999 he joined the School of Electrical and Information Engineering at the University of Sydney as a Senior Lecturer, where he started the Computing and Audio Research Laboratory, together with Craig Jin. He was promoted to Reader in 2004. In 2003 he was awarded an Australian Research Council ARC Research Fellowship followed by an ARC Queen Elisabeth II Research Fellowship in 2008.

In 2011 he became a research professor at Western Sydney University and leader of the Biomedical Engineering and Neuromorphic Systems (BENS) Research Program in the MARCS Institute for Brain, Behaviour, and Development. In 2018, he became the Director of the International Centre for Neuromorphic Systems.

References

Fellow Members of the IEEE
Living people
Australian computer scientists
Year of birth missing (living people)
Place of birth missing (living people)